Panchatanthiram is a 2002 Indian Tamil-language comedy film directed by K. S. Ravikumar and written with Kamal Haasan, with the dialogues by Crazy Mohan. The film stars Kamal Haasan, Jayaram, Ramesh Aravind, Sriman, Yugi Sethu, Simran and Ramya Krishnan with Urvashi, Aishwarya, Sanghavi, Vidhya Venkatesh, Devayani and Nagesh in supporting roles.

The film released on 28 June 2002. It opened to positive reviews from critics. Jayaram won Filmfare Award for Best Supporting Actor – Tamil at the 50th South Filmfare Awards in 2003.

Plot 

Ramachandramurthy alias Ram. C. M. is a Canada-based Indian pilot and a playboy. One day in the course of an aircraft hijacking, he meets a passenger named Mythili. Ram and Mythili stop the hijacking and save the passengers. Soon after, they fall in love and get married. Ram's four closest friends, Ayyapan Nair, Vedhantham Iyengar alias Vedham, Ganesh Hegde, and Hanumant Reddy attends their wedding reception.

After marriage, Ram quits his playboy character and remains faithful to Mythili. One day, when Ram prevents Hegde's ex-girlfriend, Nirmala, from committing suicide, Mythili misinterprets the situation as Ram having an affair with Nirmala. She then leaves him to be with her parents. Further misunderstanding occurs when he sets out to meet Mythili, drunk, in the middle of the night and enters the wrong room.

To take his mind off Mythili for a while, Ram's friends drive him down to Bangalore and rent a room to hire a call girl, Maragathavalli alias Maggie on Ram's birthday. Ram, who is still not able to forget Mythili and does not wish to betray her, gets into a fight with Maggie. To salvage the situation, Vedham hurries back to Maggie's room, only to find Maggie dead. Panicking, Nair, Vedham, Hegde, and Reddy decide to discreetly dispose of the body in spite of Ram's pleas to call the police. They manage to roll the body in a blanket, dispose it in a dry river and drive back to Chennai to return to their normal lives.

Ram discovers a cache of diamonds inside Maggie's mobile phone. He does not report about it to the police, fearing he would be arrested for murdering Maggie, which he did not commit. A few days after, the friends get very nervous when they learn of a news article regarding the discovery of a corpse in the same area where they disposed Maggie's body. At that time, the wives of Ram's four friends plan to unite Ram and Mythili by holding a party on the traditional festival of Ugadi in Reddy's house. The wives invite Mythili to the party to be reunited with Ram.

At the party, Maggie appears, demanding her diamonds back. Maggie then reveals the truth behind her death. The diamonds belong to a smuggler, and that she stole it from him for her own personal gain. She chose to merely fake her death as she realised that the diamonds would be temporarily safe in Ram's possession. She also blackmails Ram that she would reveal the truth about their rendezvous in Bangalore to Mythili and their wives if he does not give the diamonds back. The smuggler then arrives and kidnaps Maggie, Ram, and his friends. Mythili spots Ram and Maggie together. She again believes that Ram has not changed his ways. Mythili, along with an undercover police inspector, follows them.

While the smuggler demands his diamonds back, Mythili appears with the undercover police inspector. Upon seeing Ram and Maggie together, she believes that Ram is hugging Maggie along with his friends, when in reality Ram, Maggie and his friends and held captive by the smuggler. She swallows some sleeping pills, which turns out to be where Ram hid the diamonds. Mythili decides to commit suicide and goes to a bridge. After finding out that Mythili  swallowed the diamonds, Maggie and the smuggler tries saving her and take the diamonds, but they get arrested by the undercover police inspector and the police. Ram manages to save Mythili. After overhearing the conversation between Ram and his friends on what has happened, Mythili promises to reform her suspicious ways. The two then reunite.

Cast 

Kamal Haasan as Ramachandramurthy (Ram C.M.)
Jayaram as Ayyappan Nair
Simran as Mythili Ramachandramurthy (Voice dubbed by Savitha Reddy)
Ramya Krishnan as Maragathavalli (Maggie)
Ramesh Aravind as Ganesh Hegde
Sriman as Hanumant Reddy
Yugi Sethu as Vedhantham Iyengar (Vedham)
Urvashi as Ammini Ayyappan Nair
Aishwarya as Janaki Vedhantham Iyengar
Sanghavi as Chamundi Ganesh Hegde
Vidhya Venkatesh as Reddy's wife
Devayani as Nirmala, Hegde's ex-girlfriend
Vijayakumar as Mythili's Father
Nagesh as Parthasarathy, Vedham's father-in-law
Kaikala Satyanarayana as Sanjeevi Reddy, Reddy's father-in-law
Dubbing Janaki as Parvatham, Reddy's mother-in-law
Master Bharath as Appukuttan Ayyappan Nair
Manivannan as the diamond-smuggling boss
Alphonsa as Smuggling boss' Mistress
K. S. Ravikumar as Co-Pilot Kumar 
Ramesh Khanna as Sardarji/Undercover Police Inspector
Santhana Bharathi as Bharathi, a tenant in Mythili's house
Kovai Sarala as Bharathi's wife
Vasu Vikram as a Traffic Police
Neelu as Ammini's Father
Scissor Manohar as Auto driver

Production 
The film marked the debut production of director K. S. Ravikumar's manager P. L. Thenappan, and the team initially planned a film starring Kamal Haasan with music composed by A. R. Rahman. Though recordings had taken place, Thenappan became apprehensive of the budget and chose to make a smaller budget film, meaning Deva replaced Rahman. Hence Panchathanthiram, a comedy about five friends, materialised instead. Originally Krishnamachari Srikkanth and Maadhu Balaji were considered to portray the role of Vedhantham Iyengar, before Yugi Sethu was finalised. Sethu signed on revealing that Kamal Haasan had approached him to be a part of his two previous films, Thenali (2000) and Pammal K. Sambandam (2002) too, which he did not take up. Simran was signed after appearing alongside Kamal Haasan in Pammal K. Sambandam, with which the latter was impressed.

The film started shoot in February 2002 and shot in Canada for seventeen days. In April 2002, Kamal Haasan was prevented from boarding a Los Angeles-bound flight in Toronto during the making of the film, with the security preventing him from passing due to his Islamic-sounding surname. In June 2002, the five friends in the film along with Deva took part in a promotional tour to publicise the soundtrack in Bangalore. The film faced trouble during censorship and parts of a song featuring Ramya Krishnan were subsequently cut.

Soundtrack 
The soundtrack of the film was composed by Deva, with lyrics written by Vairamuthu. The song "Vai Raja Vai" incorporates lyrics from the Hindi song "Aana Meri Jaan" from Shehnai (1947), while "Manmatha Leelai" was partly influenced by Linkin Park's "Points of Authority".

Release and reception 
The film released on 28 June 2002. Malathi Rangarajan from The Hindu said that Crazy Mohan's dialogue was "the mainstay", describing the film as "completely entertaining". She also praised the film's performances claiming that "with suitable slapstick, apt body language and timing and modulation that tickle, the veteran (Kamal Haasan) makes a mark yet again." Furthermore, reviewers from Screen magazine dubbed the film as a "clean comic-entertainer", adding that "director KS Ravikumar deserves a pat for weaving out a good screenplay based on Kamal Haasan's story idea and creating a laugh riot". Tulika of Rediff labelled the film as "a barrel of laughs". Visual Dasan of Kalki felt Jayaram's talent was underused, and gave the film an "average" verdict.

The film was blockbuster and remained a cult classic in the comedy genre. Kamal Haasan distributed the film himself in the Karnataka region. A sequel to the film was planned and Ravikumar had hoped to film scenes on a cruise liner, but the project failed to take off. Ravikumar instead set his 2010 film Manmadan Ambu, which also featured Haasan, on a cruise liner. Lokesh Kanagaraj also considered making a sequel, but dropped the idea and instead collaborated with Haasan on Vikram (2022). The core plot of the movie was reported to be inspired by the 1998 black comedy film Very Bad Things.

References

External links 
 
 

2000s Tamil-language films
2002 films
Films directed by K. S. Ravikumar
Films scored by Deva (composer)
Films set in Bangalore
Films set in Canada
Films shot in Bangalore
Films shot in Canada
Films with screenplays by Crazy Mohan
Films with screenplays by Kamal Haasan
Indian black comedy films
Indian comedy films
Tamil films remade in other languages